John Greville may refer to:

John Greville (died 1547)
John Greville (died 1480)
John Greville (died 1444)

See also

John Grenville (disambiguation)